The coat of arms of the Republic of Buryatia is one of the official symbols of the Republic of Buryatia—a federal subject of Russia. It was adopted on 20 April 1995.

Notes

See also
Flag of the Republic of Buryatia
Anthem of the Republic of Buryatia

Buryatia
Buryatia